The Franklin City Cemetery in Franklin, Tennessee was listed on the National Register of Historic Places in 2012.

Four American Revolutionary War veterans are buried there.  The cemetery is significant for its history of early settlers and for its funerary markers, the most unusual of which is perhaps a "treestone" one.

It is across North Margin Street from Rest Haven Cemetery, also NRHP-listed in 2012.

References

External links
 

Cemeteries on the National Register of Historic Places in Tennessee
Buildings and structures in Franklin, Tennessee
National Register of Historic Places in Williamson County, Tennessee